M5, M-5, M.5, M-V, or M05 may refer to:

Transportation

Automobiles
 BMW M5, a German mid-size performance car series
 Dongfeng Fengxing Lingzhi M5, a Chinese MPV
 Haima M5, a Chinese compact sedan
 JAC Refine M5, a Chinese MPV
 Studebaker M5, an American pickup truck

Aviation and aerospace
 M-5 rocket, a Japanese rocket
 Macchi M.5, an Italian flying boat fighter in service from 1917 until the mid-1920s
 Miles M.5 Sparrowhawk, a 1930s British single-seat racing and touring monoplane
 Fokker M.5, a 1913 unarmed single-seat monoplane aircraft 
 Grigorovich M-5, a Russian World War I-era biplane flying boat
 Kenmore Air (IATA airline designator: M5), a small airline based in the United States

Military
 M5 Stuart, a variant of the Stuart tank, a World War II-era American light tank
 M5 Half-track, a variant of the M3 Half-track military armored personnel carrier
 M5 Tractor, World War II-era artillery-towing tractor
 M5 Bomb Trailer, a U.S. vehicle for transporting bombs to airplanes
 M5 Bayonet
 3 inch Gun M5, a U.S. Army anti-tank gun
 MSwMS M5, a Swedish Navy minesweeper 1940-1955
 M5 firing device, a trigger commonly used in Booby traps
 M7 Next Generation Squad Weapon, the future designation for the SIG MCX Spear, formerly known as the XM5

Roads and routes
 M5 (New York City bus), a New York City Bus route in Manhattan
 M5 motorway, England
 M5 (East London), a Metropolitan Route in East London, South Africa
 M5 (Cape Town), a Metropolitan Route in Cape Town, South Africa
 M5 (Johannesburg), a Metropolitan Route in Johannesburg, South Africa
 M5 (Pretoria), a Metropolitan Route in Pretoria, South Africa
 M5 (Durban), a Metropolitan Route in Durban, South Africa
 M5 (Port Elizabeth), a Metropolitan Route in Port Elizabeth, South Africa
M5 road (Zambia), a short road in Mufulira, Zambia 
 M5 Motorway (Sydney), in Sydney, Australia
 Metroad 5 (Brisbane), Brisbane, Australia, comprising the M5 Centenary Freeway and M5 Western Freeway
 M5 motorway (Northern Ireland)
 M5 motorway (Hungary)
 M-5 (Michigan highway), a state highway in the Detroit area
 M05 highway (Ukraine), a road connecting Kyiv and Odesa
 M5 highway (Russia), another name for the Ural Highway in Russia
 M5 highway (Belarus) (European route E271)
 M5 (Istanbul Metro), a subway line on the Asian side of Istanbul, Turkey
 Metro Line M5 (Budapest Metro), a proposed metro line in Budapest, Hungary
 Bucharest Metro Line M5, a metro line in Bucharest, Romania
 Line 5, Milan Metro of Milan Metro
 M5 Motorway (Syria), a motorway which connects the Syrian border with Jordan in the south with Damascus, and continues further north to Aleppo, to the border with Turkey

Sea
 M5, originally christened as Mirabella V, the world's largest single-masted yacht

Media, fiction and entertainment
 M5 Industries, a visual effects company
 Maroon 5, an American pop rock band originating from Los Angeles
 "M5", a song from the album Middle Class Revolt by The Fall
 M5, the name for the production company of prolific session musician Marlo Henderson
 M-5 (Star Trek), a computer featured in an original Star Trek episode "The Ultimate Computer"

Science and technology
 Intel m5, a brand of microprocessors
 Messier 5 (M5), a globular cluster in the constellation Serpens
 M5 fiber, a high-strength polymer used in composites
 CALM M5, a vehicular communications standard
 Sord M5, a Japanese home computer marketed in the 1980s
 Panasonic M5, a VHS-recording camcorder marketed in the 1980s
 Amateur Radio, a UK Full class license prefix
 M5, a full system computer architecture simulator for use in computer system design research
 M5 Networks, a voice-over-IP company acquired by ShoreTel in 2012
 M5, a diode part number of one of the 1N400x general-purpose diodes
 Muscarinic acetylcholine receptor M5
 Sony Xperia M5, a mobile phone

Other
 Coca-Cola M5, a line of five collectible aluminum bottles
 M5 ISO metric screw thread
 M5, a variety of Zircaloy, a zirconium-niobium alloy used in nuclear reactors
 Moscow 5, a multi-squad esports team.
 M05, FSV Mainz 05 soccer club
 ATC code M05 drugs
 M05 military camouflage pattern
 Migration 5
 M5, a difficulty grade in mixed climbing

See also
 M1905 (disambiguation)